Mayor Magrath Drive is the busiest north-south roadway and the second busiest roadway overall in Lethbridge, Alberta. In 2011, it saw roughly 34,000 vehicles per day in weekday traffic. Most retail and hospitality establishments in the city are concentrated on this roadway, and it serves as a major transportation corridor for the city and region.

History

Mayor Magrath Drive was built on a Canadian Pacific Railway line from Lethbridge to Fort Macleod that was abandoned when the High Level Bridge was constructed in 1909. Until the 1920s, the rural, gravel roadway was known as Sunshine Trail.

In 1946, Sunshine Trail was paved with asphalt for the first time. The following year, it was renamed Mayor Magrath Drive after Charles A. Magrath, the first mayor of Lethbridge.

The roadway was expanded to four lanes in 1963. This expansion also included a system of service roads and connecting avenues to provide access to future commercial and residential development. Between 2001–2004, the overburdened road was expanded to six lanes.

Traffic

In 2005, weekday traffic on Mayor Magrath Drive was recorded at 32,000 vehicles per day. Given that three provincial highways (3, 4 and 5) meet with the roadway, much of this traffic includes out-of-town tourists, commuters and truckers.

In addition, given the development of large-scale retail stores in the south end of the city, many shoppers use Mayor Magrath Drive.

Amenities

Mayor Magrath Drive holds the bulk of the city's accommodations, including international chains such as Ramada, Best Western, Travelodge and Howard Johnson. Major shopping destinations (such as Walmart, Costco, Superstore, Safeway and Home Depot) are also located on this roadway, as well as a large number of restaurants.

Henderson Park borders on Mayor Magrath Drive and contains a golf course, the Nikka Yuko Japanese Garden, and Henderson Lake, the largest urban lake in the city.

Transportation

Mayor Magrath Drive is central to transport in Lethbridge. It connects highways leading directly to the United States, British Columbia, and Saskatchewan. Several public transit routes follow the road, including the popular Link, which provides service between the Lethbridge College and Northside terminals. At the city limits Mayor Magrath Drive turns into Highway 5, which then continues to the Lethbridge County Airport.

Notes

References

Transport in Lethbridge